Caleb Costner (born March 3, 1993) is an American professional stock car racing driver. He competes in the ARCA Menards Series, driving the No. 93 Chevrolet SS for his own team, Costner Weaver Motorsports. Costner also serves as a First Responder advocate after serving over 10 years of public service to the community. Costner is also a 3rd generational race car driver in his family following after his uncle and grandfather.

Racing career

ARCA Menards Series West 

Costner made his ARCA Menards Series West debut in 2021. He attempted to make his debut in the #77 Toyota Camry sponsored by Thin Blue Wine Cellars and Jan's Towing at the Portland International Raceway, but did not start due to engine issues. He ended up making his debut at the All-American Speedway, finishing 14th of a strong 24 car field in the #77 Toyota Camry sponsored by Thin Blue Wine Cellars and Jan's Towing. He then finished the 2021 season up in the #08 Toyota Camry for Kart Idaho with new sponsor Innovative Tiny Houses by finishing 30th after losing his brakes with 40 laps to go at Phoenix.

ARCA Menards Series East 
Costner made his ARCA Menards Series East debut in 2022 for newly formed Costner Weaver Motorsports at New Smyrna Speedway. He failed to finish the race due to an overheating issue placing him in 13th.

Personal life 

While not racing, Costner owns several businesses and remains focused on serving as a First Responder advocate across the country.

Motorsports career results

ARCA Menards Series
(key) (Bold – Pole position awarded by qualifying time. Italics – Pole position earned by points standings or practice time. * – Most laps led. ** – All laps led.)

ARCA Menards Series East

ARCA Menards Series West

References 

https://www.fox46.com/organization/nascar/gaston-county-sheriffs-deputy-recognized-as-first-officer-to-race-nascar/

External links 

1993 births
Living people
ARCA Menards Series drivers
NASCAR drivers
Racing drivers from North Carolina
People from Dallas, North Carolina